Olle Laessker (2 April 1922 – 19 September 1992) was a Swedish track and field athlete who competed in long jump and sprinting events.

He had his best achievements at the 1946 European Athletics Championships in Oslo, where he won the long jump by a margin of two centimeters, then teamed up with Stig Danielsson, Inge Nilsson and Stig Håkansson to win a second gold for Sweden in the 4 × 100 metres relay. He was Sweden's first European medallist in the long jump.

Laessker was awarded the Stora grabbars märke for his achievements, listed as the 116th recipient in the sport of athletics. He was the Swedish long jump champion in 1946 and 1947.

References

1922 births
1992 deaths
Swedish male long jumpers
Swedish male sprinters
European Athletics Championships medalists
20th-century Swedish people